METZ is the debut album by Canadian band METZ, released October 9, 2012 on Sub Pop Records. The album received mostly positive reviews when it was released.

Musical style
METZ'''s musical style has been described as hardcore punk and noise rock. NME compared the album's sound to early 90s grunge. With respect to specific artists and albums, critics have cited The Jesus Lizard, The Sonics, Jawbox, Drive Like Jehu and Nirvana's Bleach as influences.

ReceptionMETZ has received mostly positive reviews. On Metacritic, the album has a score of 82 out of 100, indicating "Universal acclaim."

Stuart Berman of Pitchfork Media gave the album a Best New Music designation, writing "[..] while it ably captures the band's ferocity, Metz is less a recreation of the band's live shows than a surveillance-video document of it, one that's been edited and manipulated to maximize dynamic impact." Popmatters' Gary Suarez also praised the album, writing "METZ shines brightly, like a Molotov cocktail at the moment of impact. This is that rare record, that rare band that makes one want to pull out the old soapbox, drag it into the public square, and shout atop it until I’m hoarse." Jason Heller of The A.V. Club gave the album a grade of A, writing, "For all its abrasion and denatured noise, Metz isn’t a statement of nihilism or finality; it’s a bright, exploratory scalpel making the first of hopefully many incisions."

In a mixed review, Allmusic's Jason Lymangrover described METZ as "a ball of heavy genres, lumping together noise rock, post-punk, hardcore, no wave, or any style that might punish a pair of eardrums." In a negative review, Dusted Review's Doug Mosurock wrote "Thirty minutes of METZ feels more like hard work than fun playtimes, and the sameness of the venture underscores the futility of whatever it is they’re trying to accomplish, which falls somewhere between 'artist defending bowel movement on a gallery floor' and 'third demo tape by an up-and-coming new band.'"

The album was #44 on Pitchfork Media's list of the top 50 albums of 2012, and was a shortlisted nominee for the 2013 Polaris Music Prize.

Track listing
 "Headache" - 2:18
 "Get Off" - 2:22
 "Sad Pricks" - 2:51
 "Rats" - 3:05
 "Knife in the Water" - 2:12
 "Nausea" - 1:05
 "Wet Blanket" - 3:53
 "Wasted" - 4:07
 "The Mule" - 2:24
 "Negative Space" - 5:28
"Negative Space" ends at 3:22. At 4:15, hidden track "--))--" begins.

Personnel
The following people contributed to METZ:''

METZ
	Alex Edkins 	
	Hayden Menzies 
	Chris Slorach

Additional personnel
	Alex Bonenfant 	-	Mixing
	John Edkins 	-	Cover Photo
	Jeremy Jansen 	-	Photography
	Jeff Kleinsmith 	-	Design
	Ivy Lovell 	-	Photography
	Roger Seible 	-	Mastering
	Graham Walsh 	-	Mixing

References

2012 albums
Metz (band) albums
Sub Pop albums